Koyambedu Junction, also called the Koyambedu Roundtana, is an important road junction in Chennai, Tamil Nadu, India. It is located north of the Chennai Mofussil Bus Terminus at the junction of the Inner Ring Road and the Poonamallee High Road (NH4) in the Koyambedu area/locality. The junction is a part of the Golden Quadrilateral project taken up under the National Highways Development Project.

Grade separator
An elevated Parclo interchange is currently under construction by the National Highways Authority of India to decongest the junction which is heavily utilised by interstate buses. This design of parclo grade separator has three arms of the cloverleaf interchange. The construction of the flyover was delayed due to problems in acquiring land that was owned by Tamil Nadu MLA Vijayakanth.

Koyambedu Junction intersects two major roads, viz. Poonamallee High Road (NH 4) and the Inner Ring Road (Jawaharlal Nehru Road).

Landscaping
In 2013, the highways department begun work to landscape the 20,000 sq m space at a cost of  11 million.

As of now (Dec 2016), the landscaping is work in progress and target to complete by 2017.

Surveillance
In 2019, a police surveillance booth was constructed under the grade separator to patrol the surroundings. It is staffed by four police personnel with assistance from a regular police patrol team.

See also

Kathipara Junction
Padi Junction
Maduravoyal Junction

References

Interchanges of Chennai HSCTC
Bridges and flyovers in Chennai